Eudonia platyscia is a moth of the family Crambidae. It is endemic to the Hawaiian islands of Kauai, Molokai and Hawaii.

References

Eudonia
Endemic moths of Hawaii
Moths described in 1899